Naussac (Nauçac, or Nonçac) is a former commune in the Lozère departement in southern France. On 1 January 2016, it was merged into the new commune of Naussac-Fontanes.

See also
Communes of the Lozère department

References

Former communes of Lozère
Gévaudan